Cape Verde, officially the Republic of Cabo Verde, is an island country spanning an archipelago of 10 volcanic islands in the central Atlantic Ocean.

Most of the nation's GDP comes from the service industry. Cape Verde's economy has been steadily growing since the late 1990s, and it is now officially considered a country of average development, being only the second country to have achieved such transition, after Botswana in 1994. Cape Verde has significant cooperation with Portugal at every level of the economy, which has led it to link its currency (the Cape Verdean escudo) first to the Portuguese escudo and, in 1999, to the euro.

Notable firms 
This list includes notable companies with primary headquarters located in the country. The industry and sector follow the Industry Classification Benchmark taxonomy. Organizations which have ceased operations are included and noted as defunct.

S.A. (Sociedade Anónima) roughly corresponds to Ltd..  Most of these companies trade at the Bolsa de Valores de Cabo Verde (BVC).

See also 
 List of banks in Cape Verde

References

 
Cape Verde